Eileen Ramsay ( Ainsworth; 16 December 1940 – 18 January 2023) was a British writer of romance novels. She wrote 18 books from 1985.

Biography
Eileen Ainsworth was born in Ayrshire, Scotland on 16 December 1940. After graduating she went to teach in the United States for 18 years. She married Ian Ramsay, a Scottish scientist, and they had two children. They returned to Scotland, and after teaching for a few years she became a full-time writer.

Ramsay was elected the twenty-seventh chairman (2015–2017) of the Romantic Novelists' Association.

Ramsay died of pneumonia on 18 January 2023 at the age of 82.

Bibliography

As Eileen Ainsworth Ramsay

Romance novel
The Mysterious Marquis (1985)

As Eileen Ramsay

Romance novels
 The Broken Gate (1994)
 The Dominie's Lassie (1995)
 Butterflies in December (1995)
 The Quality of Mercy (1997)
 Walnut Shell Days (1997)
 Harvest of Courage (1998)
 Never Call It Loving (1998)
 The Wings of Friendship (2001)
 The Feein' Market (2002)
 Lace for a Lady (2002)
 Someday, Somewhere (2003)
 A Way of Forgiving (2004)
 The Stuff of Dreams (2005)
 Rainbow's End (2006)
 Henriqueta's treasure (2008)
 Love Changes Everything (2012)

Flowers of Scotland
 Rich Girl, Poor Girl (2017)
 The Farm Girl's Dream (2017)
 A Pinch of Salt (2017)

Children's fiction
 Danger by Gaslight (1998)

Anthologies
 Sakura and other stories (2012)

References and sources

1940 births
2023 deaths
People from Ayrshire
Scottish expatriates in the United States
Scottish romantic fiction writers
Women romantic fiction writers